George Augustus O'Keeffe (12 August 1930 – 3 March 2012) was an Australian rules footballer who played with Melbourne in the Victorian Football League (VFL).

Notes

External links 

1930 births
2012 deaths
Australian rules footballers from Victoria (Australia)
Melbourne Football Club players